Wahlenbergbreen is a glacier in Oscar II Land at Spitsbergen, Svalbard. The glacier is named after Göran Wahlenberg.

See also
Wahlenbergfjorden
Wahlenbergfjellet

References

Glaciers of Spitsbergen